Anime Network is an American video on demand (VOD) network dedicated to anime owned by AMC Networks.

History 

The network was launched in North America in late 2002 and is marketed to multi system operators (MSOs) as both a free and subscription Video On Demand (VOD) programming service. Anime Network also provides online streaming of its anime for North America  via its website with free full-length preview episodes for non-members, more episodes for members, and all online titles available for subscribers.

In October 2007, Anime Network was launched on DirecTV On Demand, initially on channel 1801 at launch. As of the fall of 2015, it can now be found on channel 1889.

The Anime Network ceased broadcast of its linear 24/7 network on January 1, 2008; it continues to support a VOD service and online player on its main website. On September 1, 2009, A.D. Vision had sold off the Anime Network to Valkyrie Media Partners LLC as part of the dissolution of the company and the reorganization of its assets.

In June 2017, Section23 Films announced it would discontinue the Anime Network Online streaming service and focus solely on Anime Network's pay television and subscription VOD services. HIDIVE, LLC, a new company which is not affiliated with Anime Network, Section23, or Sentai Filmworks, acquired Anime Network Online's assets and spun them off into a new streaming service called HIDIVE. On June 20, 2017, Anime Network Inc. announced it acquired the "www.theanimenetwork.com" domain name from Anime Network Online.

Availability and distribution
At launch, the Anime Network was only available by Video On Demand to Comcast subscribers in the Philadelphia area with 1.2 million customers with more providers choosing to carry the service later on.  The linear service launched on June 30, 2004, to complement the VOD service. Comcast Communications previously carried the channel on video on demand since its launch. On May 29, 2009, Comcast discontinued carriage of the service in both its free package and its pay-per-view digital television package which, however, are periodically included among Comcast Xfinity's Top Picks.

24/7 linear service
From June 30, 2004, to January 4, 2008, Anime Network offered a 24/7 channel available to pay television providers. The service was only carried by small cable companies. On January 4, 2008, Anime Network officially announced that the 24/7 service would cease operations. The network will still operate as a VOD provider.

Video On Demand
The Anime Network's content is distributed through video on demand in two formats.

Sony announced at E3 2010 that the PlayStation Network would begin carrying The Anime Network.

Anime Network (UK)
 

On June 3, 2007, Anime Network was launched in the United Kingdom as a programming block on the Propeller TV satellite channel, produced by A.D. Vision. It was broadcast as a 2-hour block with 4 different anime series and aired from 8:00pm to 10:00pm, 7 days a week.  The block was removed from the schedule on January 1, 2008, which was the same day Anime Network discontinued its North American 24/7 linear service to continue to support its VOD service.

References

External links
 
 Anime Network's Online-Player - List of current titles

Television networks in the United States
Television channels and stations established in 2002
ADV Films
Sentai Filmworks
Maiden Japan
Anime television
2002 establishments in the United States
AMC Networks